Salma Baig (20 August 1944 - 19 October 1995) popularly known as Kumari Naaz or Baby Naaz was an Indian actress in Hindi language films.

Career
She started her career as a child actor in films. Her best remembered role as a child artiste was in R. K. Films’ Boot Polish (1954) and Bimal Roy's Devdas. She earned rave reviews for her earnest natural performance from The New York Times and a special distinction (along with co-actor Rattan Kumar) from Cannes Film Festival in 1955, where the film was shown in competition.

In 1958, a Hindi film adaptation called Do Phool (Two Flowers) was released based on the Swiss literary novel/ icon Heidi. The role of Heidi – called Poornima in the film – was played by Baby Naaz who was one of the most famous child stars at the time along with Master Romi.

She matured into a character actress and bagged good roles in films like Bahu Begum, Kati Patang and Sachaa Jhutha (where she played Rajesh Khanna's physically challenged sister).

Awards and honours
1955 Cannes Film Festival
 Special Mention to a child actress 

It was a Distinction award which was a tie between two child artistes at the 1955 Cannes Film Festival. The other was Pablito Calvo for his child actor performance in the 1955 Spanish film Marcelino, pan y vino.

Later career
She later transitioned into a second career as a dubbing artiste. Before Sridevi started using her own voice, Kumari Naaz dubbed for her in the early Hindi hits of the 1980s.

Personal life
She married actor Subbiraj (cousin of veteran actor Raj Kapoor) in 1965 and continued working. The two had acted together in Mera Ghar Mere Bachche (1960) and Dekha Pyar Tumhara (1963).

Filmography
Her films include:

References

External links
 

Indian film actresses
Actresses in Hindi cinema
20th-century Indian actresses
Actresses from Mumbai
1944 births
1995 deaths